Alexandru Ivlev (born February 7, 1981) is a Moldovan former swimmer, who specialized in backstroke events. He is a two-time Olympian, and a member of the swimming team for Olimpia Chişinău.

Ivlev's Olympic debut came at the 2000 Summer Olympics in Sydney. There, he established a personal best of 57.91 to top the first heat of the men's 100 m backstroke, but finished only in thirty-eighth place.

At the 2004 Summer Olympics in Athens, Ivlev qualified again for the 100 m backstroke by clearing a FINA B-standard entry time of 58.39 from the Russian Open Championships in Moscow. Unlike his first Olympics, Ivlev raced to third place on the same heat by 0.21 of a second behind Kazakhstan's Stanislav Osinsky in 1:00.13. Ivlev failed to advance into the semifinals, as he placed forty-second overall in the preliminaries.

References

1981 births
Living people
Moldovan male backstroke swimmers
Olympic swimmers of Moldova
Swimmers at the 2000 Summer Olympics
Swimmers at the 2004 Summer Olympics
Male backstroke swimmers
Sportspeople from Chișinău